Richard Fitzgerald VC (December 1831, St. Finbar's, Cork, Ireland – 1884 in India) was an Irish recipient of the Victoria Cross.

Details
He was approximately 25 years old, and a Gunner in the Bengal Horse Artillery, Bengal Army during the Indian Mutiny when the following deed took place on 28 September 1857 at Bolandshahr, India for which he and Sergeant Bernard Diamond was awarded the Victoria Cross:

Fitzgerald died in India in 1884. Fitzgerald's VC is currently held, as is his Indian Mutiny medal, by Bristol Museum.

References

Listed in order of publication year 
The Register of the Victoria Cross (1981, 1988 and 1997)

Ireland's VCs (Dept of Economic Development 1995)
Monuments to Courage (David Harvey, 1999)
Irish Winners of the Victoria Cross (Richard Doherty & David Truesdale, Four Courts, 2000 )

1831 births
1884 deaths
19th-century Irish people
Irish soldiers in the British East India Company Army
Irish Anglicans
Irish recipients of the Victoria Cross
Indian Rebellion of 1857 recipients of the Victoria Cross
People from Cork (city)
Military personnel from County Cork